In August 2012, Wunderman launched a joint venture PT Wunderman Pamungkas Indonesia based in Jakarta.  Wunderman offers digital marketing and CRM to global and local brands and partners with Indonesian digital veterans Rahardian and Nugraha Agung, as well as Tomy Prastowo. Collectively, the Group, including associates, employs more than 46,000 people in the Asia Pacific region, generating revenues of $4.97 billion. In Indonesia, the Group, including associates, employs 1,300 people with revenues of over $80 million.

References

Service companies of Indonesia
Marketing companies
Companies based in Jakarta
Marketing companies established in 2012